Liabygda Church is a parish church of the Church of Norway in Stranda Municipality in Møre og Romsdal county, Norway. It is located in the village of Liabygda, on the northern shore of the Norddalsfjorden. It is the church for the Liabygda parish which is part of the Nordre Sunnmøre prosti (deanery) in the Diocese of Møre. The white, wooden church was built in a long church design in 1917 using plans drawn up by the architect Hans Bucher. The church seats about 165 people.

History

In 1908, the people of Liabygda were given permission to build a small prayer house in the village to be used on certain occasions since their local parish church, Stranda Church was located on the other side of the fjord, making it much more difficult to reach. Soon after its construction, it was expanded to make it more like a chapel. In 1914, permission was granted to build a larger chapel. Drawings were prepared by Henry Bucher and Tore Overå was the lead builder. The old building was torn down and the new chapel was constructed in 1917. The building was consecrated on 15 August 1917. The building was restored and enlarged in 1989-1990. Around the same time, the chapel was upgraded to the status of a full parish church.

See also
List of churches in Møre

References

Stranda
Churches in Møre og Romsdal
Long churches in Norway
Wooden churches in Norway
20th-century Church of Norway church buildings
Churches completed in 1917
1908 establishments in Norway